600,000 Francs a Month is a 1933 French comedy film directed by Léo Joannon. It is a remake of the 1926 silent film of the same name.

Cast
  as Colchester  
 Georges Biscot as Galupin  
 Suzette Comte as Anna  
 Louis Florencie as Bique  
  as John Durand  
 Jacques Luce as Bernard  
  as Madame Brochet  
 Germaine Michel as Madame Galupin

References

External links
 

1933 films
1933 comedy films
French comedy films
1930s French-language films
Films directed by Léo Joannon
Remakes of French films
Sound film remakes of silent films
Films based on adaptations
Films based on French novels
French films based on plays
Pathé films
French black-and-white films
1930s French films